3-Hydroxypentanoic acid, or beta-hydroxypentanoate, is the organic compound with the formula .  It is one of the hydroxypentanoic acids.   It is made from odd carbon fatty acids in the liver and rapidly enters the brain.  As opposed to 4-carbon ketone bodies, 3-hydroxypentanoic acid is anaplerotic, meaning it can refill the pool of TCA cycle intermediates. The triglyceride triheptanoin is used clinically to produce beta-hydroxypentanoate.

References

Beta hydroxy acids